Scott Murray (born 27 August 1972) is an Australian former professional rugby league footballer who played for Eastern Suburbs, St. George, South Sydney and Cronulla-Sutherland.

Murray made 50 first-grade appearances in his 10-year career at the top level. During his first-grade career he was used in various positions, but featured mostly as a centre and five-eighth. He has coached the Sydney Roosters, South Sydney and Canterbury in the now defunct NRL Under-20s competition.

References

External links
Scott Murray at Rugby League project

1972 births
Living people
Australian rugby league coaches
Australian rugby league players
Sydney Roosters players
St. George Dragons players
South Sydney Rabbitohs players
Cronulla-Sutherland Sharks players
Rugby league centres
Rugby league five-eighths